Dr. Miklós Kállay de Nagykálló (23 January 1887, in Nyíregyháza – 14 January 1967, in New York City) was a Hungarian politician who served as Prime Minister of Hungary during World War II, from 9 March 1942 to 22 March 1944. By early 1942, Hungary's regent Admiral Horthy was seeking to put some distance between himself and Hitler's regime. He dismissed the pro-German prime minister László Bárdossy, and replaced him with Kállay, a moderate whom Horthy expected to loosen Hungary's ties to Germany.

Kállay successfully protected refugees and prisoners, resisted Nazi pressure regarding Jews, established contact with the Allies and negotiated conditions under which Hungary would switch sides against Germany. However the Allies were not close enough. When the Germans occupied Hungary in March 1944 Kállay went into hiding. He was finally captured by the Nazis, but was liberated when the war ended. He went into exile in 1946, dying two decades later in New York.

Career
The Kállay family was old and influential among the local gentry of their region and Miklós served as lord-lieutenant (ispán) of his county from 1921 to 1929. He then moved on to national government, serving first as deputy under secretary of state for the Ministry of Trade (1929–31) and later as minister of agriculture (1932–35). He resigned in 1935 in protest over the right-wing policies of Prime Minister Gyula Gömbös.  He kept out of politics for most of the next decade before Hungarian Regent Miklós Horthy asked him to form a government to reverse the pro-Nazi policies of László Bárdossy in March 1942. The German minister in Budapest, Dietrich von Jagow reported to Berlin: "Kállay is basically an apolitical person and has not been active in the last few years either in internal or foreign affairs. National Socialism is an "alien" concept to him and he bears no inner sympathy with it. Nevertheless he will no doubt continue the same relations with Germany as his successor".

Although Hungary remained allied with Nazi Germany, Kállay and Horthy were conservatives who were unsympathetic to fascism, and Kállay's government refused to participate in the rounding up of Jews and other activities desired by the Nazis.  However, on October 24, 1942, while announcing a special property tax on Jews 'to guarantee suitable housing for Christians', Kállay was reported in the international press as declaring: "Jews must abandon all hope. Other measures already worked out will be taken in the near future against Jews. I will do my utmost to see that economic key positions now held by Jews are transferred to Christians as soon as possible".

The government also allowed the left-wing opposition (except for the Communists) to function without much interference.  In foreign affairs, Kállay supported the German war effort against the Soviet Union.  However, he made numerous peaceful overtures to the Western Allies, even going as far as to promise to surrender to them unconditionally once they reached Hungary's borders.  The Germans finally had enough of their ally's policies and occupied Hungary in March 1944, forcing Horthy to oust Kállay and replace him with the more pliable Döme Sztójay.

Kállay was able to evade the Nazis at first, but he was eventually captured and sent first to the Dachau concentration camp and later to Mauthausen. In late April 1945 he was transferred to Tyrol together with other prominent concentration camp inmates, where the SS left the prisoners behind. He was liberated by the Fifth U.S. Army on 5 May 1945.

In 1946 he went into exile, finally settling in the United States in 1951. In 1954, he published his memoirs, Hungarian Premier: A Personal Account of a Nation's Struggle in the Second World War (Columbia University Press).

See also
 Diplomatic history of World War II
 Hungary in World War II

References

Sources

 Czettler, Antal. "Miklos Kallay's attempts to preserve Hungary's independence." Hungarian Quarterly 41.159 (2000): 88-103.
Antal Ullein-Reviczky, Guerre Allemande, Paix Russe: Le Drame Hongrois. Neuchatel: Editions de la Baconniere, 1947.
Nicholas Kállay, Hungarian premier: a personal account of a nation's struggle in the second world war; forew. by C. A. Macartney, New York : Columbia Univ. P., 1954. online review
C A Macartney, October Fifteenth: A History of Modern Hungary, 1929–1945, 2 vols, Edinburgh University Press 1956–7.
György Ránki, Unternehmen Margarethe: Die deutsche Besetzung Ungarns, Böhlau, 1984.
Ignac Romsics, Hungary in the Twentieth Century, Budapest: Corvina, 1999.0
 Antal Ullein-Reviczky, German War, Russian Peace: The Hungarian Tragedy. Translated by Lovice Mária Ullein-Reviczky. Reno, NV. Helena History Press, 2014.

External links
 

1887 births
1967 deaths
People from Nyíregyháza
People from the Kingdom of Hungary
Hungarian nobility
Prime Ministers of Hungary
Foreign ministers of Hungary
Agriculture ministers of Hungary
Miklos
World War II political leaders
Hungarian people of World War II
Dachau concentration camp survivors
Mauthausen concentration camp survivors
Hungarian anti-communists
Hungarian emigrants to the United States
Heads of government who were later imprisoned
Unity Party (Hungary) politicians